Teja Singh Sutantar (16 July 1901 − 12 April 1973), also Swatantar, was a national revolutionary of India who fought for the independence of India from the British Empire and for the liberation of Punjab peasantry from the clutches of feudal lords. He was a member of the 5th Lok Sabha from Sangrur constituency as a CPI candidate. He also was Member of Punjab Legislative Assembly from 1937 to 1945 and member of Punjab Legislative Council from 1964 to 1969. 

He became actively involved in the revolutionary activities during the 1920s when the Ghadar Party was preparing for the second attempt for the overthrow of British government. Sutantar was sent to Turkey in 1924 where he joined the Turkish military academy to attain military knowledge. In and out of prison several times, Sutantar was among the top national Communist leaders jailed by the British administration in the Deoli Detention Centre in the early-1940's.

Sutantar was a popular Communist leader in the Kirti Kisan Party and later Central Committee member and General Secretary of the Lal Communist Party Hind Union. The party published a magazine, Lal Jhanda, from 1948-1952 under the editorship of Teja Singh Sutantar, managed by Gandharv Sen. Sutantar was among the tallest leaders in undivided Punjab and, post-Partition, on the Indian side who led the struggles of the peasantry, along with the likes of Bhagat Singh Bilga and Baba Bujha Singh. In 1952 Lal Communist Party Hind Union merged into Communist Party of India. He become the president of All India Kisan Sabha from 1968 to 1973.

References

Further reading 

1901 births
1973 deaths
Communist Party of India politicians from Punjab, India
People from Gurdaspur district
Indian independence activists from Punjab, India